"Shine" is a song written and recorded by American country music artist Waylon Jennings.  It was released in November 1981 as the first single from his album Black on Black.  The song reached #5 on the Billboard Hot Country Singles chart and #1 on the RPM Country Tracks chart in Canada. It was also the closing theme in the 1981 film "The Pursuit of D. B. Cooper" under a bluegrass version of the song.

Charts

References

1981 singles
1981 songs
Waylon Jennings songs
Songs written by Waylon Jennings
Song recordings produced by Chips Moman
RCA Records singles